is a railway station in the city of Mino, Gifu Prefecture, Japan, operated by the third sector railway operator Nagaragawa Railway.

Lines

Station layout
Yunohora-Onsenguchi Station has one ground-level side platform serving a single bi-directional track. The station is unattended.

Adjacent stations

|-
!colspan=5|Nagaragawa Railway

History
On December 20, 1956, the station was renamed . Operations were transferred from the Japan National Railway (JNR) to the Nagaragawa Railway on December 11, 1986. The station was renamed to its present name on that date

Surrounding area

Nagara River
 Yunohora Onsen

See also
 List of Railway Stations in Japan

References

External links

 

Railway stations in Japan opened in 1926
Railway stations in Gifu Prefecture
Stations of Nagaragawa Railway
Mino, Gifu